The Talodi are a sub-ethnic group of the Nuba peoples in the Nuba Mountains of South Kordofan state, in southern Sudan.  They likely number more than 1,000 people.

The area's city and district, Talodi, are named for them.

Language
The Talodi people speak Talodi in the Talodi–Heiban languages group. They are in the Kordofanian languages grouping of the Nuba Mountains, which is a branch of the major Niger–Congo language family.

See also
Demography of Sudan
Index: Nuba peoples

References
Joshua Project

Nuba peoples
Ethnic groups in Sudan